Clark County Courthouse was a historic courthouse located at Kahoka, Clark County, Missouri. It was built in 1871, and was a two-story, cross-plan, brick building sheathed in stucco. The building featured quoins, bracketed eaves, and an octagonal cupola.  It was demolished following a 2010 vote.

It was listed on the National Register of Historic Places in 1983.

References

Courthouses on the National Register of Historic Places in Missouri
County courthouses in Missouri
Government buildings completed in 1871
Buildings and structures in Clark County, Missouri
National Register of Historic Places in Clark County, Missouri
1871 establishments in Missouri